The M1 is a 203 km (126 mi) long highway running across the Azeri coast. The route runs from the border of Russia to Baku. Near Baku the road is a motorway. The entire route is part of the European route E119 and Asian Highway AH8.

References

M1